Kingsville is an unincorporated community in Prince Edward County, Virginia, United States. It sits on the intersection of VA 133 and US 15

Historical Significance
 Before the American Revolution, Kingsville was the site of "King's Tavern."
 The British cavalryman, Banastre Tarleton, raiding, camped in Kingsville in 1781, in the same year sick and wounded French soldiers were brought to this Kingsville from Yorktown.  Seventy of them are buried in Kingsville.
 Kingsville is the site of the colonial church of which Archibald McRoberts was minister.

References

Unincorporated communities in Virginia
Unincorporated communities in Prince Edward County, Virginia